David Vincent Baker is a designer of tabletop role playing games and the owner of Lumpley Games which also hosts the archives of The Forge. His most notable games are Dogs in the Vineyard and Apocalypse World. 

Dogs in the Vineyard was the 2004 Indie RPG Game of the Year and won the Innovation Award and was one of three games shortlisted for the 2004 Diana Jones Award and Most Innovative Game. Apocalypse World won Game of the Year, Best Support, and Most Innovative game at the 2010 Indie RPG Awards, 2011 Lucca Comics & Games (Apocalypse World for Best Role-Playing Game) and was 2011 RPG of the Year at both the Golden Geek Awards and Lucca Comics & Games.

Career
Vincent Baker is the designer of the Indie role-playing game Dogs in the Vineyard (2004), one of the first indies to be notably successful, both financially and sociologically. This game was the story of God's Watchdogs, trying to preserve the faithful on the hostile American frontier of the 19th century, and introduced the idea of "say yes or roll". Baker also designed kill puppies for satan (2001), Mechaton (2006), Apocalypse World (2010), and other indie role-playing games. Apocalypse World is a post-apocalyptic game co-designed with his wife, Meguey Baker, published through Lumpley Games. Apocalypse World won multiple awards such as the 2010 Indie RPG Award for "Game of the Year" and the 2011 Lucca Comics & Games "Best Role-Playing Game" award. Powered by the Apocalypse, the game design framework created by the Bakers for Apocalypse World, has made a lasting impact on role-playing game design.

He also co-designed with his wife both Firebrands (2017), a romance TTRPG in a sci-fi setting focused on mobile frame pilots, and Under Hollow Hills (2021), an RPG about fairytales and a traveling circus. Jay Dragon, for Polygon, wrote that "Under Hollow Hills is a game about how we treat each other when times are good and how we treat each other when times are bad — between its gorgeous prose, fascinating imaginative characters, countless treasures, and natural flowing play style, Under Hollow Hills is the future of tabletop role-playing games, a unique and impossible treasure".

Baker and Emily Care Boss are attributed as formulating the Lumpley Principle (a.k.a. Baker-Care Principle) which states "System (including but not limited to 'the rules') is defined as the means by which the group agrees to imagined events during play."  Further development of the Lumpley Principle described player contributions as being assigned credibility by the other players in the game.

Lumpley Games 

Baker's publishing imprint is called Lumpley Games. He began using "lumpley" email addresses and URLs in kill puppies for satan (2001); he had used the name on various online systems, and it would quickly become the name of Baker's indie publishing company too. Baker produced 40 or 50 copies of the game and sold them all, which would give them the money for his next project; Baker says that he hasn't put a dime into Lumpley since that initial investment. The Cheap and Cheesy Fantasy Game (2001) was the first game by Baker that called itself "a lumpley game." Lumpley Games published Baker's Dogs in the Vineyard (2004).

Personal life

Baker lives in Greenfield, Massachusetts. He is the father of three children and is the husband of fellow roleplaying game designer Meguey Baker.

Bibliography

Role-playing games 
 kill puppies for satan (2001)
cockroach souffle (2002)
The Cheap and Cheesy Fantasy Game (2001)
Matchmaker (2001)
 Dogs in the Vineyard (2004)
The Abductinators (2003)
Mechaton (2006)
Mobile Frame Zero: Rapid Attack (2012)
 Poison'd (2007)
 In a Wicked Age (2007)
 Apocalypse World (2010)
Apocalypse World 2nd Edition (2016)
Apocalypse World: the Extended Refbook (2019)
Apocalypse World: Burned Over Hackbook (2019)
 The Sundered Land (2013)
The Seclusium of Orphone of the Three Visions (2013), a supplement for Lamentations of the Flame Princess
Firebrands (2017)
Murderous Ghosts (2017)
Under Hollow Hills (2021)

References

External links 
 
 Lumpley Games Forum on The Forge

American game designers
Indie role-playing game designers
Living people
Role-playing game designers
Year of birth missing (living people)